HonestReporting (also Honest Reporting or honestreporting.com) is a non-governmental organization that "monitors the media for bias against Israel" and has been described by several news outlets as a "pro-Israel media watchdog group". The organization is a United States 501(c)3 registered charity headquartered in New York City, with its editorial staff based in Jerusalem.

History
HonestReporting (HR) was founded as an email list by Jewish British university students in 2000, and sponsored by the Aish Hatorah Yeshiva, after a skewed news report in The New York Times showed a bleeding boy near a yelling Israeli soldier waving a club. The caption read "An Israeli Policeman and a Palestinian on Temple Mount." The picture was interpreted as depicting the Israelis as aggressors against Palestinian children and was used in an official Egyptian government website, in the Palestinian information center website www.islam.net and on online calls to boycott Coca-Cola for doing business with Israel. In fact, the picture was of an American Jewish boy, Tuvia Grossman, being saved by Israeli soldiers from a lynch mob in the mostly Arab neighborhood of Wadi Joz in Jerusalem, during Rosh Hashanah, at the onset of the Second Intifada. The boy's father sent a letter to The New York Times, but the caption was at first only partly corrected. The email list called for the readers to personally participate in getting the editors to show the facts, urging the readers to first carefully read the article and decide for themselves, and then to respond factually and correctly in their own words. The readers were also urged to send in similar news coverage that was unfactual or written in a biased way. The list reported about successful cases, the first being the full correction of the first article by The New York Times and the publication of the ordeal the boy actually went through.

By 2003 the list had 150,000 subscribers and began raising funds for it to become an independent organization. In 2003, HonestReporting Canada (HRC) was founded as an "independent, non-profit organization" headquartered in Toronto, Canada. In 2006, HonestReporting was granted "independent Charitable Organization status in Israel to complement its US status."

In March 2006, a dedicated website by HonestReporting for covering the Media in the UK was launched by two expatriate Britons, CEO Joe Hyams, and Managing Editor Simon Plosker. In 2011, the HR UK website was merged into the main site.

Mission

HonestReporting's self-declared mission statement claims that,

"We embrace the principle that a healthy democracy requires a well informed citizenry. Accordingly, the mission of HonestReporting is to ensure truth, integrity and fairness, and to combat ideological prejudice in journalism and the media, as it impacts Israel. We engage the next generation and educate the public to understand and value the above aspirations."

Activities
HonestReporting reviews news articles and op-eds regarding Israel to check for and respond to any bias or fake news. They create and distribute content and tools for readers to understand news about Israel from a fair perspective. They hold in-person and on-line events with experts about how the Jewish people and Israel is portrayed in the media.

Successes 
HonestReporting has prompted many corrections in the media over the years including:

Idris Muktar Ibrahim, a producer at CNN, was found to have written on Twitter praise for Hamas and in a separate tweet posted "#TeamHitler." After HonestReporting contacted CNN about the producer's ability to report impartially, CNN ended their working relationship with him. He later apologized.

Award-winning journalist Shatha Hammad was discovered to have posted on Facebook that she was friends with Adolf Hitler and that they "share the same ideology, such as the extermination of the Jews" Hammad made other posts using the nickname "Hitler" and denying Israel's right to exist. She also termed terrorists who murdered Israeli worshippers in the 2014 Jerusalem synagogue attack as "martyrs." After HonestReporting's exposure of her posts, the Thomson Reuters Foundation and the Kurt Schork Memorial Fund withdrew the awards they had granted her.

News producer Fady Hanona was discovered to have posted Anti-semitic social media posts by HonestReporting, leading news outlets he previously worked for such as The New York Times, The Guardian, and others to cut ties with him. 

In 2010, CNN fired its Senior Mideast Editor Octavia Nasr after HonestReporting highlighted a Twitter message saying that she respected the Shiite cleric the Grand Ayatollah Mohammed Hussein Fadlallah, one of Hezbollah's founders. The New York Times Media Decoder blog wrote: Some supporters of Israel seized on the Twitter posting almost immediately. A Web site called Honest Reporting that says it is "dedicated to defending Israel against prejudice in the media" asked, "Is Nasr a Hezbollah sympathizer? This is disturbing enough given that the group is designated a terrorist organization by the U.S. and is committed to the destruction of Israel. "And which of Fadlallah's individual views does Nasr admire?"

Criticism

The American Journalism Review described the organisation as a "pro-Israeli pressure group".

After being criticized by HonestReporting for articles published by The Independent, author Robert Fisk wrote in the Independent that some of their readers sent him hate-mail.

Following a 2004 article published in the British Medical Journal which criticised Israel for a high level of Palestinian civilian casualties and claimed that the pattern of injuries suggested routine targeting of children in situations of minimal or no threat, the journal received over 500 responses to its website and nearly 1,000 sent directly to its editor. In an analysis of the responses published in the journal, Karl Sabbagh concluded that the correspondence was orchestrated by Honest Reporting and aimed at silencing legitimate criticism of Israel. In his analysis Sabbagh pointed to evidence that the correspondents had not read the article. Sabbagh also documented a significant proportion of offensive, abusive and racist insults among the correspondence. An editorial by the BMJ referred to the campaign as bullying and said that the best way to counter such behaviour was to expose it to public scrutiny. Daniel Finkelstein, associate editor of The Times, responded that Sabbagh's piece was "anti-Israel propaganda" that did not meet even "basic academic standards" of scientific analysis.

Honest Reporting Canada
HonestReporting Canada (HRC) is the Canadian counterpart of the organization. It monitors Canadian media coverage of Israel and the Middle East to promote what it calls "balanced, accurate, and unbiased reporting" about Israel.

HonestReporting Canada (HRC) was established in 2003 as an independent, non-profit group headquartered in Toronto, Canada. Since then, HRC has opened an office in Montreal in April 2008, giving them official national and bilingual status. HRC plans to further expand across the country to other large Canadian cities and extend their operations to include regular monitoring of college and university campus papers.

The executive director of HonestReporting Canada is Mike Fegelman. Prominent Canadian Conservative Member of Parliament and Cabinet Minister Peter Kent has served on the board of Honest Reporting Canada.

Staff 
The Chief Executive Officer of HonestReporting is Jacki Alexander. She previously worked at the American Israel Public Affairs Committee in Florida and has a master's degree in the History of International Relations from the London School of Economics and BA in History and Religious Studies. The Executive Director of HonestReporting is Gil Hoffman. He was previously chief political correspondent for the Jerusalem Post. The Editorial Director of HonestReporting is Simon Plosker who worked with the group from 2005 to 2020 and returned in 2022. He previously worked in various non-governmental organizations in the UK and Israel. The Director of Finance and Administration of HonestReporting is Jerry Glazer, a US CPA.

See also
Arab Media Watch
Committee for Accuracy in Middle East Reporting in America
Fairness and Accuracy in Reporting
Jewish Internet Defense Force
Media bias
Media coverage of the Arab–Israeli conflict
Media Watch International

References

External links
 Honest Reporting official website
 Honest Reporting Canada: the official Canadian affiliate
 HonestReporting.org, which reports critically on HonestReporting
 Media manipulators by David Leigh in The Guardian, criticizing HonestReporting
 HonestReporting.com's response  to the "Media manipulators" article, at Aish.com

Media analysis organizations and websites
Non-governmental organizations involved in the Israeli–Palestinian conflict
Organizations established in 2000
Media coverage of the Arab–Israeli conflict